Battle of Odesa refers to one of several military engagements in the city of Odesa, Ukraine:

 Attack on Odesa during the Black Sea raid in 1914 during World War I
 Siege of Odessa (1941), during World War II
 2022 bombing of Odesa, during the 2022 Russian invasion of Ukraine